Saidabad (also Romanized as Sa‘īdābād; also known as Seyyedābād) is a village in Vandadeh Rural District, Meymeh District, Shahin Shahr and Meymeh County, Isfahan Province, Iran. At the 2006 census, its population was 37, in 12 families.

References 

Populated places in Shahin Shahr and Meymeh County